Sânpetru may refer to:

In Romania:
Sânpetru, a commune in Brașov County
Sânpetru de Câmpie, a commune in Mureș County 
Sânpetru Mare, a commune in Timiș County 
Sânpetru, a village in Sântămăria-Orlea commune, Hunedoara County
Sânpetru Almaşului, a village in Hida commune, Sălaj County
Sânpetru German, a village in Secusigiu commune, Arad County
Sânpetru Mic, a village in Variaș commune, Timiș County

See also
Valea Sânpetrului (disambiguation)